

Post-World War II
The Convention on the Prevention and Punishment of the Crime of Genocide (CPPCG) was adopted by the UN General Assembly on 9 December 1948 and came into effect on 12 January 1951 (Resolution 260 (III)). After the necessary 20 countries became parties to the convention, it came into force as international law on 12 January 1951. At that time however, only two of the five permanent members of the UN Security Council (UNSC) were parties to the treaty, which caused the convention to languish for over four decades.

Post–World War II Central and Eastern Europe

Ethnic cleansing of Germans

After WWII ended in Europe, about 11–12 million Germans were forced to flee from or were expelled from several countries throughout Eastern and Central Europe, including Russia, Romania, Czechoslovakia, Hungary, Yugoslavia and the prewar territory of Poland. A large number of them were also displaced when Germany's former eastern provinces either passed to Soviet Russia or became part of Poland in accordance with the Potsdam Agreement (Poland lost some of these territories in various periods over several centuries), regardless of the fact that those lands had been under heavy German ethnic and cultural influence since the German colonization of them in the Late Middle Ages or the 19th century, and the fact that they had been under German rule since the conquests and expansion of Brandenburg and Prussia. The majority of these expelled and displaced Germans ended up in what remained of Germany, with some of them being sent to West Germany and others being sent to East Germany.
The ethnic cleansing of the Germans was the largest displacement of a single European population in modern history. Estimates for the total number of those who died during the removals range from 500,000 to 2,000,000, where the higher figures include "unsolved cases" of persons reported as missing and presumed dead. Many German civilians were sent to internment and labor camps as well, where they often died. Usually, the events are either classified as a population transfer, or they are classified as an ethnic cleansing. Felix Ermacora, among a minority of legal scholars, equated ethnic cleansing with genocide, and stated that the expulsion of the Germans therefore constituted genocide.

Partition of India 

The Partition of India was the partition of the British Indian Empire that led to the creation of the sovereign states of the Dominion of Pakistan (which later split into Pakistan and Bangladesh) and the Dominion of India (later the Republic of India) on 15 August 1947. During the Partition, one of British India's provinces, the Punjab Province, was split along communal lines into West Punjab and East Punjab (later split into the three separate modern-day Indian states of Punjab, Haryana and Himachal Pradesh). West Punjab was formed out of the Muslim majority districts of the former British Indian Punjab Province, while East Punjab was formed out of the Hindu and Sikh majority districts of the former province.

Hindus, Muslims and Sikhs who had co-existed for a millennium attacked each other in what is argued to be a retributive genocide of horrific proportions, accompanied by arson, looting, rape and abduction of women. The Indian government claimed that 33,000 Hindu and Sikh women were abducted, and the Pakistani government claimed that 50,000 Muslim women were abducted during riots. By 1949, there were governmental claims that 12,000 women had been recovered in India and 6,000 women had been recovered in Pakistan. By 1954 there were 20,728 recovered Muslim women and 9,032 Hindu and Sikh women recovered from Pakistan.

This partition triggered off what was one of the world's largest mass migrations in modern history. Around 11.2 million people successfully crossed the India-West Pakistan border, mostly through the Punjab. 6.5 million Muslims migrated from India to West Pakistan and 4.7 million Hindus and Sikhs from West Pakistan arrived in India. However many people went missing.

A study of the total population inflows and outflows in the districts of the Punjab, using the data provided by the 1931 and 1951 Census has led to an estimate of 1.26 million missing Muslims who left western India but did not reach Pakistan. The corresponding number of missing Hindus/Sikhs along the western border is estimated to be approximately 0.84 million. This puts the total number of missing people due to Partition-related migration along the Punjabi border at around 2.23 million.

Nisid Hajari, in Midnight's Furies (Houghton Mifflin Harcourt) wrote:Gangs of killers set whole villages aflame, hacking to death men and children and the aged while carrying off young women to be raped. Some British soldiers and journalists who had witnessed the Nazi death camps claimed Partition's brutalities were worse: pregnant women had their breasts cut off and babies hacked out of their bellies; infants were found literally roasted on spits.By the time the violence had subsided, Hindus and Sikhs had been completely wiped out of Pakistan's West Punjab and similarly Muslims were completely wiped out of India's East Punjab.

Partition also affected other areas of the subcontinent besides the Punjab. Anti-Hindu riots took place in Hyderabad, Sind. On 6 January anti-Hindu riots broke out in Karachi, leading to an estimate of 1100 casualties. 776,000 Sindhi Hindus fled to India.

Anti-Muslim riots also rocked Delhi. According to Gyanendra Pandey's recent account of the Delhi violence between 20,000 and 25,000 Muslims in the city lost their lives. Tens of thousands of Muslims were driven to refugee camps regardless of their political affiliations and numerous historic sites in Delhi such as the Purana Qila, Idgah and Nizamuddin were transformed into refugee camps. At the culmination of the tensions in Delhi 330,000 Muslims were forced to flee the city to Pakistan. The 1951 Census registered a drop of the Muslim population in Delhi from 33.22% in 1941 to 5.33% in 1951. Meanwhile, as a result of the Noakhali riots and Direct Action Day, Hindus in Bangladesh dwindled from 28% in the 1940s to a mere 9% in 2011. During the Noakhali riots, more than 5,000 were massacred in eight days and there were reports of numerous forced conversions, arson, abduction and rape by the Bangladeshi local Muslim population.

Since 1951 
The CPPCG was adopted by the UN General Assembly on 9 December 1948 and came into effect on 12 January 1951 (Resolution 260 (III)). After the necessary 20 countries became parties to the convention, it came into force as international law on 12 January 1951. At that time however, only two of the five permanent members of the UN Security Council (UNSC) were parties to the treaty, which caused the convention to languish for over four decades.

Australia

Sir Ronald Wilson, a former president of Australia's Human Rights Commission, stated that Australia's program in which 20–25,000 Aboriginal children were forcibly separated from their natural families was genocide, because it was intended to cause the Aboriginal people to die out. The program ran from 1900 to 1969. The nature and extent of the removals have been disputed within Australia, with opponents questioning the findings contained in the Commission report and asserting that the size of the Stolen Generation had been exaggerated. The intent and effects of the government policy were also disputed.

Zanzibar

In 1964, towards the end of the Zanzibar Revolution—which led to the overthrow of the Sultan of Zanzibar and his mainly Arab government by local African revolutionaries—John Okello claimed in radio speeches to have killed or imprisoned tens of thousands of the Sultan's "enemies and stooges", but estimates of the number of deaths vary greatly, from "hundreds" to 20,000. The New York Times and other Western newspapers gave figures of 2–4,000; the higher numbers possibly were inflated by Okello's own broadcasts and exaggerated media reports. The killing of Arab prisoners and their burial in mass graves was documented by an Italian film crew, filming from a helicopter, in Africa Addio. Many Arabs fled to safety in Oman and by Okello's order no Europeans were harmed. The violence did not spread to Pemba. Leo Kuper described the killing of Arabs in Zanzibar as genocide.

Nigeria

Biafra (1966–1970)

After Nigeria gained its independence from British rule in 1960, stigma towards the Igbo ethnic group of the east increased. When a supposedly Igbo led coup overthrew and murdered senior government officials, the other ethnic groups of Nigeria, particularly the Hausa, launched a massive anti-Igbo campaign. This campaign began with the 1966 anti-Igbo pogrom and the 1966 Nigerian counter-coup. In the pogrom, Igbo property was destroyed and up to 300,000 Igbos fled the North and sought safety in the East and about 30,000 Igbos were killed. In the counter-coup that followed, Igbo civilians and military personnel were also systematically murdered. On 30 May 1967, when the Igbos declared their independence from Nigeria and formed the breakaway state of Biafra, the Nigerian and British governments launched a total blockade of Biafra. Initially on the offensive, Biafra began to suffer and its government frequently had to move because the Nigerian army kept on conquering its capital cities. The main cause of death was starvation, and children suffered the most. Children were often afflicted with Kwashiorkor, a disease caused by malnutrition. The people resorted to cannibalism on many occasions. The documentation of the suffering of the Igbo children is attributed to the work of the French Red Cross and other Christian organisations. There are many estimates for the death toll of the Igbo in the genocide. The number of soldiers who were killed in the war is estimated to be 100,000 and the number of civilians who were also killed ranges from 500,000 to 3.5 million. More than half of those who died in the war were children. Currently, Nigeria still suppresses peaceful protests by Biafra independence hopefuls, often by sending soldiers to beat protestors and even to kill them.

Algeria

Sétif and Guelma 
The Sétif and Guelma massacre was a series of attacks by French colonial authorities and pied-noir settler militias on Algerian civilians in 1945 around the market town of Sétif, west of Constantine, in French Algeria. French police fired on demonstrators at a protest on 8 May 1945.  Riots in the town were followed by attacks on French settlers (colons) in the surrounding countryside, resulting in 102 deaths. Subsequent attacks by the French colonial authorities and European settlers killed between 6,000 and 30,000 Muslims in the region.  The words which are used in reference to the events which occurred there are often instrumentalized or they often carry a memorial connotation. The word massacre, currently applied in historical research to the Muslim Algerian victims of May 1945, was first used in French propaganda in reference to the 102 European colonial settler victims; apparently to justify the French suppression. The word genocide, used by Bouteflika for example, does not apply to the events in Guelma, since the Algerian victims who were killed there were reportedly targeted because of their nationalist activism; which might make the Guelma massacre a politicide according to B. Harff and Ted R. Gurr's definition. The term massacre is, according to Jacques Sémelin a more useful methodological tool for historians who wish to study an event whose definition is debated.

Harkis 

After independence was gained after the Algerian War the Harkis (Muslims who supported the French during the war) were seen as traitors by many Algerians, and many of those who stayed behind suffered severe reprisals after independence. French historians estimate that somewhere between 50,000 and 150,000 Harkis and members of their families were killed by the FLN or by lynch mobs in Algeria, often in atrocious circumstances or after torture.

Cambodia (1975–1979)

In Cambodia between 1975 and 1979, a genocide was committed by the Khmer Rouge (KR) regime in which an estimated 1.5 to 3 million people died. The KR group and its leader Pol Pot overthrew Lon Nol and the Khmer Republic when it captured Phnom Penh at the end of the Cambodian Civil War on 17 April 1975, renamed Cambodia Democratic Kampuchea and wanted to transform Cambodia into an agrarian socialist society which would be governed according to the ideals of Stalinism and Maoism. The KR's policies which included the forced relocation of the Cambodian population from urban centers to rural areas, torture, mass executions, the use of forced labor, malnutrition, and disease caused the death of an estimated 25 percent of Cambodia's total population (around 2 million people). The genocide ended following the Vietnamese invasion of Cambodia. Since then, at least 20,000 mass graves, known as the Killing Fields, have been uncovered.

The Khmer Rouge, led by Pol Pot, Ta Mok and other leaders, organized the mass killing of ideologically suspect groups, ethnic minorities such as ethnic Vietnamese, Chinese (or Sino-Khmers), Chams and Thais, former civil servants, former government soldiers, Buddhist monks, secular intellectuals and professionals, and former city dwellers. Khmer Rouge cadres who were defeated in factional struggles were also liquidated in purges. Man-made famine and slave labor resulted in many hundreds of thousands of deaths. Craig Etcheson suggested that the death toll was between 2 and 2.5 million, with a "most likely" figure of 2.2 million. After 5 years of researching 20,000 grave sites, he concluded that "these mass graves contain the remains of 1,386,734 victims of execution." However, some scholars argued that the Khmer Rouge were not racist and they had no intention to exterminate ethnic minorities or the Cambodian people as a whole; in the view of these scholars, the Khmer Rouge's brutality was the product of an extreme version of communist ideology.
    
On 6 June 2003, the Cambodian government and the United Nations agreed to set up the Extraordinary Chambers in the Courts of Cambodia (ECCC), which would exclusively focus on the crimes which were committed by the most senior Khmer Rouge officials during the period of Khmer Rouge rule from 1975 to 1979. The judges were sworn in during early July 2006.

The investigating judges were presented with the names of five possible suspects by the prosecution on 18 July 2007. 

Kang Kek Iew was formally charged with war crimes and crimes against humanity and detained by the Tribunal on 31 July 2007. He was indicted on charges of war crimes and crimes against humanity on 12 August 2008. His appeal was rejected on 3 February 2012, and he continued serving a sentence of life imprisonment.

Nuon Chea, a former prime minister, was indicted on charges of genocide, war crimes, crimes against humanity and several other crimes under Cambodian law on 15 September 2010. He was transferred into the custody of the ECCC on 19 September 2007. His trial began on 27 June 2011. On 16 November 2018, he was sentenced to a life in prison for genocide.

Khieu Samphan, a former head of state, was indicted on charges of genocide, war crimes, crimes against humanity and several other crimes under Cambodian law on 15 September 2010. He was transferred into the custody of the ECCC on 19 September 2007. His trial also began on 27 June 2011. On 16 November 2018, he was sentenced to a life in prison for genocide.

Ieng Sary, a former foreign minister, was indicted on charges of genocide, war crimes, crimes against humanity and several other crimes under Cambodian law on 15 September 2010. He was transferred into the custody of the ECCC on 12 November 2007. His trial began on 27 June 2011. He died in March 2013.

Ieng Thirith, wife of Ieng Sary and a former minister for social affairs, was indicted on charges of genocide, war crimes, crimes against humanity and several other crimes under Cambodian law on 15 September 2010. She was transferred into the custody of the ECCC on 12 November 2007. Proceedings against her have been suspended pending a health evaluation.
   
Some of the international jurists and the Cambodian government disagreed over whether any other people should be tried by the Tribunal.

Guatemala (1981–1983)

During the Guatemalan civil war, between 140,000 and 200,000 people are estimated to have died and more than one million people fled their homes and hundreds of villages were destroyed. The officially chartered Historical Clarification Commission attributed more than 93% of all documented human rights violations to U.S.–supported Guatemala's military government; and estimated that Maya Indians accounted for 83% of the victims. Although the war lasted from 1960 to 1996, the Historical Clarification Commission concluded that genocide might have occurred between 1981 and 1983, when the government and guerrilla had the fiercest and bloodiest combats and strategies, especially in the oil-rich area of Ixcán on the northern part of Quiché. The total numbers of killed or "disappeared" was estimated to be around 200,000, although this is an extrapolation that was done by the Historical Clarification Commission based on the cases that they documented, and there were no more than 50,000. The commission also found that U.S. corporations and government officials "exercised pressure to maintain the country's archaic and unjust socio-economic structure", and that the Central Intelligence Agency backed illegal counterinsurgency operations.

In 1999, Nobel peace prize winner Rigoberta Menchú brought a case against the military leadership in a Spanish Court. Six officials, among them Efraín Ríos Montt and Óscar Humberto Mejía Victores, were formally charged on 7 July 2006 to appear in the Spanish National Court after Spain's Constitutional Court ruled in 2005 that Spanish courts could exercise universal jurisdiction over war crimes committed during the Guatemalan Civil War. In May 2013, Rios Montt was found guilty of genocide for killing 1,700 indigenous Ixil Mayans during 1982–83 by a Guatemalan court and sentenced to 80 years in prison. However, on 20 May 2013, the Constitutional Court of Guatemala overturned the conviction, voiding all proceedings back to 19 April and ordering that the trial be "reset" to that point, pending a dispute over the recusal of judges. Ríos Montt's trial was supposed to resume in January 2015, but it was suspended after a judge was forced to recuse herself. Doctors declared Ríos Montt unfit to stand trial on 8 July 2015, noting that he would be unable to understand the charges brought against him.

Bangladesh Liberation War Genocide of 1971

An academic consensus holds that the events that took place during the Bangladesh Liberation War constituted genocide. During the nine-month-long conflict an estimated 300,000 to 3 million people were killed and the Pakistani armed forces raped between 200,000 and 400,000 Bangladeshi women and girls in an act of genocidal rape.

A 2008 study estimated that up to 269,000 civilians died in the conflict; the authors noted that this is far higher than two earlier estimates.

A case was filed in the Federal Court of Australia on 20 September 2006 for alleged war crimes, crimes against humanity and genocide during 1971 by the Pakistani Armed Forces and its collaborators:

On 21 May 2007, at the request of the applicant the case was discontinued.

Burundi in 1972 and 1993

After Burundi gained its independence in 1962, two events occurred which were labeled genocides. The first event was the mass-killing of Hutus by Burundi's Tutsi-dominated government and army in 1972 and the second event was the killing of Tutsis by Burundi's Hutu population in 1993. This event and the coup attempt which triggered it also triggered the Burundian Civil War and it was recognized as an act of genocide in the final report of the International Commission of Inquiry for Burundi which was presented to the United Nations Security Council in 2002.

North Korea

Several million people in North Korea have died of starvation since the mid-1990s, with aid groups and human rights NGOs often stating that the North Korean government has systematically and deliberately prevented food aid from reaching the areas which are most devastated by food shortages. An additional one million people have died in North Korea's political prison camps, which are used to detain dissidents and their entire families, including children, for perceived political offences.

In 2004, Yad Vashem called on the international community to investigate "political genocide" in North Korea.

In September 2011, a Harvard International Review article argued that the North Korean government was violating the UN Genocide Convention by systematically killing half-Chinese babies and members of religious groups. North Korea's Christian population, which was considered to be the center of Christianity in East Asia in 1945 and included 25–30% of the inhabitants of Pyongyang, has been systematically massacred and persecuted; as of 2012 50,000–70,000 Christians were imprisoned in North Korea's concentration camps.

Equatorial Guinea
Francisco Macías Nguema was the first President of Equatorial Guinea, from 1968 until his overthrow in 1979. During his presidency, his country was nicknamed "the Auschwitz of Africa". Nguema's regime was characterized by its abandonment of all government functions except internal security, which was accomplished by terror; he acted as his country's chief judge and sentenced thousands of people to death. This led to the death or exile of up to 1/3 of the country's population. From a population of 300,000, an estimated 80,000 had been killed, in particular those of the Bubi ethnic minority on Bioko associated with relative wealth and education. Uneasy around educated people, he had killed everyone who wore spectacles. All schools were ordered closed in 1975. The economy collapsed and skilled citizens and foreigners emigrated.

On 3 August 1979, he was overthrown by his nephew Teodoro Obiang Nguema Mbasogo. Macías Nguema was captured and tried for genocide and other crimes along with 10 others. All were found guilty, four received terms of imprisonment and Nguema and the other six were executed on 29 September.

John B. Quigley noted at Macías Nguema's trial that Equatorial Guinea had not ratified the Genocide convention and that records of the court proceedings show that there was some confusion over whether Nguema and his co-defendants were tried under the laws of Spain (the former colonial government) or whether the trial was justified on the claim that the Genocide Convention was part of customary international law. Quigley stated, "The Macias case stands out as the most confusing of domestic genocide prosecutions from the standpoint of the applicable law. The Macias conviction is also problematic from the standpoint of the identity of the protected group."

Indonesia

Indonesian mass killings of 1965–66

In the mid-1960s, hundreds of thousands of leftists and others who were tied to the Communist Party of Indonesia (PKI) were massacred by the Indonesian military and right-wing paramilitary groups after a failed coup attempt which was blamed on the Communists. At least 500,000 people were killed over a period of several months, and thousands of other people were interned in prisons and concentration camps under extremely inhumane conditions. The violence culminated in the fall of President Sukarno and the commencement of Suharto's thirty-year authoritarian rule. Some scholars have described the killings as genocide, including Robert Cribb, Jess Melvin and Joshua Oppenheimer.

According to scholars and a 2016 international tribunal held in the Hague, Western powers, including Great Britain, Australia and the United States, aided and abetted the mass killings. U.S. Embassy officials provided kill lists to the Indonesian military which contained the names of 5,000 suspected high-ranking members of the PKI. Many of those accused of being Communists were journalists, trade union leaders and intellectuals.

Methods of killing included beheading, evisceration, dismemberment and castration. A top-secret CIA report stated that the massacres "rank as one of the worst mass murders of the 20th century, along with the Soviet purges of the 1930s, the Nazi mass murders during the Second World War, and the Maoist bloodbath of the early 1950s."

West New Guinea/West Papua

An estimated 100,000+ Papuans have died since Indonesia took control of West New Guinea from the Dutch Government in 1963. An academic report alleged that "contemporary evidence set out [in this report] suggests that the Indonesian government has committed proscribed acts with the intent to destroy the West Papuans as such, in violation of the 1948 Convention on the Prevention and Punishment of the Crime of Genocide and the customary international law prohibition this Convention embodies."

East Timor

East Timor was invaded by Indonesia on 7 December 1975 and it remained under Indonesian occupation as an annexed territory with provincial status until it gained its independence from Indonesia in 1999. A detailed statistical report which was prepared for the Commission for Reception, Truth and Reconciliation in East Timor cited a lower range of 102,800 conflict-related deaths in the period from 1974 to 1999, namely, approximately 18,600 killings and 84,200 excess deaths which were caused by hunger and illness, including deaths which were caused by the Indonesian military's use of "starvation as a weapon to exterminate the East Timorese", most of which occurred during the Indonesian occupation. Earlier estimates of the number of people who died during the occupation ranged from 60,000 to 200,000.

According to Sian Powell, a UN report confirmed that the Indonesian military used starvation as a weapon and employed Napalm and chemical weapons, which poisoned the food and water supply. Ben Kiernan wrote:

the crimes committed ... in East Timor, with a toll of 150,000 in a population of 650,000, clearly meet a range of sociological definitions of genocide ... [with] both political and ethnic groups as possible victims of genocide. The victims in East Timor included not only that substantial 'part' of the Timorese 'national group' targeted for destruction because of their resistance to Indonesian annexation ... but also most members of the twenty-thousand strong ethnic Chinese minority.

Philippines

Moros

Many human rights violations were committed under the conjugal dictatorship of Ferdinand and Imelda Marcos, including genocide, especially that of the Moro people who live in the south. These ethnically based massacres included the Palimbang massacre, the Bingcul massacre, and the Jabidah massacre, which triggered the Islamic Moro conflict which continues to the present day.

Bangladesh

Biharis

Immediately after the Bangladesh independence war of 1971, those Biharis who were still living in Bangladesh were accused of being "pro-Pakistani" "traitors" by the Bengalis, and an estimated 1,000 to 150,000 Biharis were killed by Bengali mobs in what has been described as a "Retributive Genocide". Mukti Bahini has been accused of crimes against minority Biharis by the Government of Pakistan. According to a white paper released by the Pakistani government, the Awami League killed 30,000 Biharis and West Pakistanis. Bengali mobs were often armed, sometimes with machetes and bamboo staffs. 300 Biharis were killed by Bengali mobs in Chittagong. The massacre was used by the Pakistani Army as a justification to launch Operation Searchlight against the Bengali nationalist movement. Biharis were massacred in Jessore, Panchabibi and Khulna (where, in March 1972, 300 to 1,000 Biharis were killed and their bodies were thrown into a nearby river). Having generated unrest among Bengalis, Biharis became the target of retaliation. The Minorities at Risk project puts the number of Biharis killed during the war at 1,000; however, R.J. Rummel cites a "likely" figure of 150,000.

Indigenous Chakmas

In Bangladesh the persecution of the indigenous tribes of the Chittagong Hill Tracts such as the Chakma, Marma, Tripura and others, who are mainly Buddhists, has been described as genocidal. There are also accusations of Chakmas being forced to leave their religion, many of them children who have been abducted for this purpose. The conflict started soon after Bangladeshi independence in 1971, when the Constitution imposed Bengali as the only sole language and a military coup happened in 1975. Subsequently, the government encouraged and sponsored the massive settlement of Bangladeshis in the region, which changed the indigenous population's demographics from 98 percent in 1971 to fifty percent by 2000. The Bangladeshi government sent one third of its military forces to the region to support the settlers, sparking a protracted guerilla war between Hill tribes and the military. During this conflict, which officially ended in 1997, and during the subsequent period, a large number of human rights violations against the indigenous peoples have been reported, with violence against indigenous women being particularly extreme.

Bengali soldiers and some fundamentalists settlers were also accused of raping native Jumma (Chakma) women "with impunity", with the Bangladeshi security forces doing little or nothing to protect the Jummas and instead assisting the rapists and settlers.

Although Bangladesh is an officially secular country, the events leading up to East Pakistan's secession amounted to religious and ethnic genocide.

Laos

By 1975, as a result of the loss of American support and the collapse of South Vietnam at the end of the Vietnam War, the Pathet Lao was able to win the Laotian Civil War, take control of the Laotian government in December of that year, abolish the constitutional monarchy which controlled it and establish a Marxist–Leninist state, which is called the Lao People's Democratic Republic. Hmong people, especially those Hmong who had fought against the Pathet Lao, were singled out for retribution. Of those Hmong people who remained in Laos, over 30,000 were sent to re-education camps as political prisoners where they served indeterminate, sometimes life sentences. Enduring hard physical labor and difficult living conditions, many Hmong people died. Thousands of other Hmong people, mainly former soldiers and their families, escaped to remote mountain regions—particularly to Phou Bia, the highest (and thus the least accessible) mountain peak in Laos. At first, these loosely organized groups staged attacks against the Pathet Lao and Vietnamese troops. Other groups of Hmong people remained in hiding in order to avoid conflict. Initial military successes by these small bands led to military counter-attacks by government forces, including aerial bombing raids and the use of heavy artillery, as well as the use of defoliants and chemical weapons.
Vang Pobzeb estimates that 300,000 Hmong and Lao people have been killed by the Vietnamese and Laotian governments since 1975 and he calls these killings a genocide. Today, most Hmong people in Laos live peacefully in villages and cities, but small groups of Hmong people, many of them second or third generation descendants of former CIA soldiers, remain internally displaced in remote parts of Laos, in fear of government reprisals. As recently as 2003, there were reports of sporadic attacks by these groups, but journalists who have visited their secret camps in recent years have described the people who live in them as being hungry, sick, and lacking weapons except Vietnam War-era rifles. Despite posing no military threat, the Laotian government has continued to characterize these people as "bandits" and it continues to attack their positions, using rape as a weapon and often killing and injuring women and children. Most of the casualties occur while people are gathering food from the jungle, because the establishment of permanent settlements is not possible.

Argentina

In September 2006, Miguel Osvaldo Etchecolatz, who had been the police commissioner of the province of Buenos Aires during the Dirty War (1976–1983), was found guilty of six counts of murder, six counts of unlawful imprisonment and seven counts of torture in a federal court. The judge who presided over the case, Carlos Rozanski, described the offences as part of a systematic attack that was intended to destroy parts of society that the victims represented and as such was genocide. Rozanski noted that CPPCG does not include the elimination of political groups (because that group was removed at the behest of Stalin), but instead based his findings on 11 December 1946 United Nations General Assembly Resolution 96 barring acts of genocide "when racial, religious, political and other groups have been destroyed, entirely or in part" (which passed unanimously), because he considered the original UN definition to be more legitimate than the politically compromised CPPCG definition.

Ethiopia

Mengistu regime 
Ethiopia's former Soviet-backed Marxist dictator Mengistu Haile Mariam was tried in an Ethiopian court, in absentia, for his role in mass killings. Mengistu's charge sheet and evidence list covered 8,000 pages. The evidence against him included signed execution orders, videos of torture sessions, and personal testimonies. The trial began in 1994 and on 12 December 2006 Mengistu was found guilty of genocide and other offences. He was sentenced to life in prison in January 2007. Ethiopian law includes attempts to annihilate political groups in its definition of genocide.
106 Derg officials were accused of genocide during the trials, but only 36 of them were present. Several former Derg members have been sentenced to death. Zimbabwe refused to respond to Ethiopia's extradition request for Mengistu, which permitted him to avoid a life sentence. Mengistu supported Robert Mugabe, the former long-standing President of Zimbabwe, during his leadership of Ethiopia.

Michael Clough, a US attorney and longtime Ethiopia observer, told Voice of America in a statement released on 13 December 2006,
The biggest problem with prosecuting Mengistu for genocide is that his actions did not necessarily target a particular group. They were directed against anybody who was opposing his government, and they were generally much more political than based on any ethnic targeting. In contrast, the irony is the Ethiopian government itself has been accused of genocide based on atrocities committed in Gambella. I'm not sure that they qualify as genocide either. But in Gambella, the incidents, which were well documented in a human rights report of about 2 years ago, were clearly directed at a particular group, the tribal group, the Anuak.

An estimated 150,000 university students, intellectuals, and politicians were killed during Mengistu's rule. Amnesty International estimates that up to 500,000 people were killed during the Ethiopian Red Terror Human Rights Watch described the Red Terror as "one of the most systematic uses of mass murder by a state ever witnessed in Africa". During his reign it was not uncommon to see students, suspected government critics or rebel sympathisers hanging from lampposts. Mengistu himself is alleged to have murdered opponents by garroting or shooting them, saying that he was leading by example.

Amhara genocide

Uganda

Idi Amin's regime
After Idi Amin Dada overthrew the regime of Milton Obote in 1971, he declared that the Acholi and Lango tribes were his enemies, because Obote was a Lango and Amin saw their domination of the army as a threat to his rule. In January 1972, Amin issued an order to the Ugandan army which commanded it to assemble and kill all Acholi and Lango soldiers, and then, he ordered the Ugandan army to round up all Acholi and Lango soldiers and confine them within army barracks, there, they were either slaughtered by the Ugandan army or they were killed when the Ugandan air force bombed the barracks.

Bush War (1981–1985)
The genocide under Amin would later lead to reprisals by Milton Obote's regime during the Ugandan Bush War, resulting in widespread human rights abuses which primarily targeted the Baganda people.  These abuses included the forced removal of 750,000 civilians from the area of the then Luweero District, including present-day Kiboga, Kyankwanzi, Nakaseke, and others. They were moved into refugee camps controlled by the military. Many civilians outside the camps, in what came to be known as the "Luweero triangle", were continuously abused as "guerrilla sympathizers". The International Committee of the Red Cross has estimated that by July 1985, the Obote regime had been responsible for more than 300,000 civilian deaths across Uganda.

Ba'athist Iraq 

The regime of Saddam Hussein has been accused of committing multiple mass killings and genocides. According to Human Rights Watch, 290,000 Iraqis were killed or disappeared by Saddam's regime:
The estimate of 290,000 "disappeared" and presumed killed includes the following: more than 100,000 Kurds killed during the 1987-88 Anfal campaign and lead-up to it; between 50,000 and 70,000 Shi`a arrested in the 1980s and held indefinitely without charge, who remain unaccounted for today; an estimated 8,000 males of the Barzani clan removed from resettlement camps in Iraqi Kurdistan in 1983; 10,000 or more males separated from Feyli Kurdish families and deported to Iran in the 1980s; an estimated 50,000 opposition activists, including Communists and other leftists, Kurds and other minorities, and out-of-favor Ba`thists, arrested and "disappeared" in the 1980s and 1990s; some 30,000 Iraqi Shi`a men rounded up after the abortive March 1991 uprising and not heard from since; hundreds of Shi`a clerics and their students arrested and "disappeared" after 1991; several thousand marsh Arabs who disappeared after being taken into custody during military operations in the southern marshlands; and those executed in detention-in some years several thousand-in so-called "prison cleansing" campaigns.

Genocide of Kurds 

On 23 December 2005, a Dutch court delivered its ruling in a case which was brought against Frans van Anraat, who had previously supplied chemicals to Iraq. The court ruled that "[it] thinks and considers it legally and convincingly proven that the Kurdish population meets the requirement under the genocide convention as an ethnic group. The court has no other conclusion than that these attacks were committed with the intent to destroy the Kurdish population of Iraq." Because van Anraat supplied the chemicals before 16 March 1988, the date of the Halabja poison gas attack he was guilty of a war crime but he was not guilty of complicity in genocide.

Genocide of Marsh Arabs 

The water diversion plan for the Draining of the Mesopotamian Marshes was accompanied by a series of propaganda articles by the Iraqi regime which were directed against the Ma'dan, and the wetlands were systematically converted into a desert, forcing the residents out of their settlements in the region. The western Hammar Marshes and the Qurnah or Central Marshes became completely desiccated, while the eastern Hawizeh Marshes dramatically shrank. Furthermore, villages in the marshes were attacked and burnt down and there were reports of the water being deliberately poisoned.

The majority of the Maʻdān were either displaced to areas which were adjacent to the drained marshes, abandoning their traditional lifestyle in favour of conventional agriculture, or they were displaced to towns and camps which were located in other areas of Iraq. An estimated 80,000 to 120,000 of them fled to refugee camps in Iran. The Marsh Arabs, who numbered about half a million in the 1950s, have dwindled to as few as 20,000 in Iraq. Only 1,600 of them were estimated to still be living on traditional dibins by 2003.

Besides the general UN-imposed Gulf war sanctions, there was no specific legal recourse for those people who were displaced by the drainage projects, nor was there prosecution of those who were involved in them. Article 2.c of the Genocide Convention (to which Iraq had acceded in 1951) forbids "deliberately inflicting on the group conditions of life calculated to bring about its physical destruction in whole or in part." Additionally, the Saint Petersburg Declaration says that "the only legitimate object which States should endeavour to accomplish during war is to weaken the military forces of the enemy", a provision potentially violated by the Ba'athist government as part of their campaign against the insurgents who had taken refuge in the marshlands.

People's Republic of China

Tibet

On 5 June 1959 Shri Purshottam Trikamdas, Senior Advocate, Supreme Court of India, presented a report on Tibet to the International Commission of Jurists (an NGO). The press conference address on the report states in paragraph 26:

The report by the International Commission of Jurists (1960) claimed that there was only a "cultural" genocide. ICJ Report (1960) page 346: "The committee found that acts of genocide had been committed in Tibet in an attempt to destroy the Tibetans as a religious group, and its report also stated that independent of any conventional obligation, such acts are acts of genocide. The committee did not find that there was sufficient proof of the destruction of Tibetans as a race, nation or ethnic group as such by methods that can be regarded as genocide in international law."

However, the use of the term cultural genocide is contested by academics such as Barry Sautman. Tibetan is the everyday language of the Tibetan people.

The Central Tibetan Administration and other Tibetans who work in the exile media have claimed that approximately 1.2 million Tibetans have died of starvation, violence, or other indirect causes since 1950. White states that "In all, over one million Tibetans, a fifth of Tibet's total population, had died as a result of the Chinese occupation right up until the end of the Cultural Revolution." This figure has been refuted by Patrick French, the former Director of the Free Tibet Campaign in London.

Jones argued that the struggle sessions which were held after the crushing of the 1959 Tibetan uprising may be considered acts of genocide, based on the claim that the conflict resulted in 92,000 deaths. However, according to tibetologist Tom Grunfeld, "the veracity of such a claim is difficult to verify."

From 2011 to 2016, Chen Quanguo was the Chinese Communist Party secretary of the area controlled as the Tibetan Autonomous Region. During this time he imposed policies of “breaking lineage, breaking roots, breaking connections, and breaking origins” including dramatic increases in surveillance and strictly enforcing rules against displaying images of the Dalai Lama. Chen was later made party secretary of the Xinjiang Uyghur Autonomous Region where he oversaw the genocide of the Uyghur people.

In 2013, Spain's top criminal court decided to hear a case which was brought before it by Tibetan rights activists who alleged that Chinese Communist Party's former general secretary Hu Jintao had committed genocide in Tibet. Spain's High Court dropped this case in June 2014.

Paraguay

Between 1956 and 1989, while under the military rule of General Alfredo Stroessner, the indigenous population of Paraguay had more territory taken than at any other period in Paraguay's history and were subjected to systematic human rights abuses. In 1971, Mark Münzel, a German anthropologist accused Stroessner of attempted genocide against the indigenous peoples of Paraguay and Bartomeu Melià, a Jesuit anthropologist stated that the forced relocations of the indigenous peoples was ethnocide. In the early 1970s the Stroessner regime was charged by international groups of being complicit in genocide. However, because of the repressive actions undertaken by the state the indigenous tribes organized themselves politically and had a major role in bringing about the end of the military dictatorship and the eventual transition to democracy.

The Aché of Eastern Paraguay were especially hard-hit by the Stroessner regime's policies. Under Stroessner, the Paraguayan government promoted the exploitation of Aché territory by multinational corporations for its natural resources. During the 1960s and 1970s, 85 percent of the Aché tribe died, with many hacked to death with machetes to make room for the timber industry, mining, farming and ranchers. One estimate posits this amounts to 900 deaths.

Brazil

The Helmet Massacre of the Tikuna people which occurred in 1988 was initially labeled a homicide. During the massacre four people died, nineteen were wounded, and ten disappeared. Since 1994 Brazilian courts have labeled the episode a genocide. Thirteen men were convicted of genocide in 2001. In November 2004, after an appeal was filed before Brazil's federal court, the man initially found guilty of hiring men to carry out the genocide was acquitted, and the killers had their initial sentences of 15–25 years reduced to 12 years.

In November 2005, during an investigation which was code-named Operation Rio Pardo, Mario Lucio Avelar, a Brazilian public prosecutor in Cuiabá, told Survival International that he believed that there were sufficient grounds to prosecute the perpetrators of the genocide of the Rio Pardo Indians. In November 2006 twenty-nine people were arrested and others were implicated, such as a former police commander and the governor of Mato Grosso state.

In 2006 the Brazilian Supreme Federal Court (STF) unanimously reaffirmed its ruling that the crime which is known as the Haximu massacre (perpetrated against the Yanomami people in 1993) was a genocide and ruled that the decision of a federal court to sentence miners to 19 years in prison for genocide in connection with other offenses, such as smuggling and illegal mining, was valid.

Zimbabwe
The Gukurahundi was a series of massacres of Ndebele civilians which were carried out by the Zimbabwe National Army from early 1983 to late 1987. Its name is derived from a Shona language term which reads "the early rain which washes away the chaff before the spring rains" when it is loosely translated into English. During the Rhodesian Bush War two rival nationalist parties, Robert Mugabe's Zimbabwe African National Union (ZANU) and Joshua Nkomo's Zimbabwe African People's Union (ZAPU), had emerged in order to challenge Rhodesia's predominantly white government. ZANU initially defined Gukurahundi as an ideological strategy which was aimed at carrying the war into major settlements and individual homesteads. Following Mugabe's ascension to power, his government remained threatened by "dissidents"—disgruntled former guerrillas and supporters of ZAPU. ZANU mainly recruited from the majority Shona people, whereas ZAPU received its greatest amount of support among the minority Ndebele. In early 1983, the North Korean-trained Fifth Brigade, an infantry brigade of the Zimbabwe National Army (ZNA), launched a crackdown against dissidents in Matabeleland North Province, a homeland of the Ndebele. Over the following two years, thousands of Ndebele were either detained by government forces and marched to re-education camps or they were summarily executed. Although there are different estimates, the consensus of the International Association of Genocide Scholars (IAGS) is that more than 20,000 people were killed. The IAGS has classified the massacres as a genocide.

Afghanistan

Democratic Republic of Afghanistan

Afghan president Mohammed Daoud Khan was deposed and murdered in 1978's Saur Revolution by the People's Democratic Party of Afghanistan (PDPA), who subsequently established their own government, the Democratic Republic of Afghanistan.  Political scientist Barnett Rubin wrote, “Khalq used mass arrests, torture, and secret executions on a scale Afghanistan had not seen since the time of Abdul Rahman Khan, and probably not even then”.

When the Soviet Union intervened in Afghanistan, deposing and killing Hafizullah Amin in Operation Storm-333 and installing Babrak Karmal as General Secretary, the brutality only grew worse. Scholars Mohammad Kakar, W. Michael Reisman and Charles Norchi believe that the Soviet Union was guilty of committing a genocide in Afghanistan. The army of the Soviet Union killed large numbers of Afghans, attempting to suppress resistance from the Afghan mujahideen. Up to 2 million Afghans were killed by the Soviet forces and their proxies. In one notable incident the Soviet Army committed mass killing of civilians in the summer of 1980. One notable war crime was the Laghman massacre in April 1985 in the villages of Kas-Aziz-Khan, Charbagh, Bala Bagh, Sabzabad, Mamdrawer, Haider Khan and Pul-i-Joghi in the Laghman Province. At least 500 civilians were killed. In the Kulchabat, Bala Karz and Mushkizi massacre which was committed on 12 October 1983, the Red Army gathered 360 people at the village square and shot them, including 20 girls and over a dozen older people. The Rauzdi massacre and Padkhwab-e Shana massacre were also documented.

Post-Soviet Afghanistan

Massacres of Hazaras and other groups by the Taliban

Between 1996 and 2001, 15 massacres were committed by the Taliban and Al-Qaeda; the United Nations stated: "These are the same types of war crimes as those which were committed in Bosnia and they should be prosecuted in international courts" Following the 1997 massacre of 3,000 Taliban prisoners by Abdul Malik Pahlawan in Mazar-i-Sharif (which the Hazaras did not commit) thousands of Hazara men and boys were massacred by other Taliban members in the same city in August 1998. After the attack, Mullah Niazi, the commander of the attackers and the new governor of Mazar, made the following declaration when he made separate speeches at several mosques in the city:
Last year you rebelled against us and killed us. From all your homes you shot at us. Now we are here to deal with you.  ...Hazaras are not Muslim, they are Shia. They are kofr (infidels). The Hazaras killed our force here, and now we have to kill Hazaras. ...If you do not show your loyalty, we will burn your houses, and we will kill you. You either accept to be Muslims or leave Afghanistan. ...[W]herever you [Hazaras] go we will catch you. If you go up, we will pull you down by your feet; if you hide below, we will pull you up by your hair. ...If anyone is hiding Hazaras in his house he too will be taken away. What [Hizb-i] Wahdat and the Hazaras did to the Talibs, we did worse ... as many as they killed, we killed more.In these killings 2,000 to 5,000, or perhaps up to 20,000 Hazara were systematically executed across the city. Niamatullah Ibrahimi described the killings as "an act of genocide at full ferocity".  The Taliban searched for combat age males by conducting door to door searches of Hazara households, shooting them and slitting their throats right in front of their families. Human rights organizations reported that the dead were lying on the streets for weeks before the Taliban allowed their burial due to stench and fear of epidemics. There were also reports of Hazara women being abducted and kept as sex slaves. The Hazara claim the Taliban executed 15,000 of their people in their campaign through northern and central Afghanistan.; the United Nation investigated three mass graves allegedly containing the victims in 2002. The persecution of Hazaras has been called genocide by media outlets.

Bosnia and Herzegovina
  

In July 1995 Bosnian Serb forces killed more than 8,000 Bosniaks (Bosnian Muslims), mainly men and boys, both in and around the town of Srebrenica during the Bosnian War. The killing was perpetrated by units of the Army of Republika Srpska (VRS) which were under the command of General Ratko Mladić. The Secretary-General of the United Nations described the mass murder as the worst crime on European soil since the Second World War. A paramilitary unit from Serbia known as the Scorpions, officially a part of the Serbian Interior Ministry until 1991, participated in the massacre, along with several hundred Russian and Greek volunteers.

In 2001 the International Criminal Tribunal for the Former Yugoslavia (ICTY) delivered its first conviction for the crime of genocide, against General Krstić for his role in the 1995 Srebrenica massacre (on appeal he was found not guilty of genocide but was instead found guilty of aiding and abetting genocide).
   
In February 2007 the International Court of Justice (ICJ) returned a judgement in the Bosnian Genocide Case. It upheld the ICTY's findings that genocide had been committed in and around Srebrenica but did not find that genocide had been committed on the wider territory of Bosnia and Herzegovina during the war. The ICJ also ruled that Serbia was not responsible for the genocide nor was it responsible for "aiding and abetting it", although it ruled that Serbia could have done more to prevent the genocide and Serbia failed to punish the perpetrators of it. Before this ruling the term Bosnian Genocide had been used by some academics and human rights officials.

In 2010, Vujadin Popović, Lieutenant Colonel and the Chief of Security of the Drina Corps of the Bosnian Serb Army, and Ljubiša Beara, Colonel and Chief of Security of the same army, were convicted of genocide, extermination, murder and persecution by the ICTY for their role in the Srebrenica massacre and were each sentenced to life in prison. In 2016 and 2017, Radovan Karadžić and Ratko Mladić were sentenced for genocide.
      
German courts handed down convictions for genocide during the Bosnian War. Novislav Djajic was indicted for his participation in the genocide, but the Higher Regional Court failed to find that there was sufficient certainty for a criminal conviction for genocide. Nevertheless, Djajic was found guilty of 14 counts of murder and one count of attempted murder. At Djajic's appeal on 23 May 1997, the Bavarian Appeals Chamber found that acts of genocide were committed in June 1992, confined within the administrative district of Foca. The Higher Regional Court (Oberlandesgericht) of Düsseldorf, in September 1997, handed down a genocide conviction against Nikola Jorgic, a Bosnian Serb from the Doboj region who was the leader of a paramilitary group located in the Doboj region. He was sentenced to four terms of life imprisonment for his involvement in genocidal actions that took place in regions of Bosnia and Herzegovina, other than Srebrenica; and "On 29 November 1999, the Higher Regional Court (Oberlandesgericht) of Düsseldorf condemned Maksim Sokolovic to 9 years in prison for aiding and abetting the crime of genocide and for grave breaches of the Geneva Conventions."

Rwanda

Tutsis

The International Criminal Tribunal for Rwanda (ICTR) is a court under the auspices of the United Nations for the prosecution of offences which were committed in Rwanda during the genocide which occurred there during April and May 1994, commencing on 6 April and coinciding with the end of the Rwandan Civil War. The ICTR was created by the UN Security Council on 8 November 1994 in order to resolve claims which were made in Rwanda, and claims which were made by Rwandan citizens who were living in nearby states, between 1 January and 31 December 1994. For approximately 100 days from the assassination of President Juvénal Habyarimana on 6 April through mid-July, at least 800,000 people were killed, according to a Human Rights Watch estimate.

As of mid-2011, the ICTR had convicted 57 people and acquitted 8 others. Another ten persons were still on trial and one is still awaiting trial. Nine other persons remain at large. The first trial, of Jean-Paul Akayesu, ended in 1998 with his conviction for genocide and crimes against humanity. This was the world's first conviction for genocide, as defined by the 1948 Convention. Jean Kambanda, interim Prime Minister during the genocide, pleaded guilty.

Hutus

In 2010 a report accused Rwanda's Tutsi-led army of committing genocide against ethnic Hutus. The report accused the Rwandan Army and allied Congolese rebels of killing tens of thousands of ethnic Hutu refugees from Rwanda and locals in systematic attacks which were committed between 1996 and 1997. The government of Rwanda rejected the accusation.

Somalia

1988–1991 Isaaq genocide

The Isaaq genocide or "(Sometimes referred to as the Hargeisa Holocaust)" was the systematic, state-sponsored massacre of Isaaq civilians between 1988 and 1991 by the Somali Democratic Republic under the dictatorship of Siad Barre. A number of genocide scholars (including Israel Charny, Gregory Stanton, Deborah Mayersen, and Adam Jones) as well as international media outlets, such as The Guardian, The Washington Post and Al Jazeera among others, have referred to the case as one of genocide. In 2001, the United Nations commissioned an investigation on past human rights violations in Somalia, specifically to find out if "crimes of international jurisdiction (i.e. war crimes, crimes against humanity or genocide) had been perpetrated during the country's civil war." The investigation was jointly commissioned by the United Nations Co-ordination Unit (UNCU) and the Office of the United Nations High Commissioner for Human Rights. The investigation concluded with a report which confirmed that the crime of genocide had taken place against the Isaaqs in Somalia.

Peru

See also

Notes

References

Bibliography

Further reading 

Genocides
Aftermath of World War II